William Douglas Crowhelm Gardom (18 June 1884 — 24 May 1944) was an Anglo-Argentine first-class cricketer.

Gardom was born in Argentina in June 1884. A club cricketer for the Hurlingham Club, he made a single appearance in first-class cricket for Argentina against the touring Marylebone Cricket Club at Buenos Aires in March 1912. Batting twice in the match, he was dismissed for a single run in the Argentine first innings by Henry Baird, while in their second innings he was dismissed for 9 runs by Eric Hatfeild. Gardom later emigrated to England, where he died at Bideford in May 1944.

References

External links

1884 births
1944 deaths
Cricketers from Buenos Aires
Argentine people of English descent
Argentine cricketers
Argentine emigrants to England